The following is a list of notable Uruguayan writers:

List of Uruguayan poets
 Teresa Amy (1950–2017)
 Washington Benavides
 Mario Benedetti
 Amanda Berenguer
 Selva Casal
 Roberto Echavarren
 Amir Hamed
 Circe Maia
 Jorge Meretta
 Eduardo Milan
 Salvador Puig
 María Herminia Sabbia y Oribe
 María Eugenia Vaz Ferreira
 Jorge Medina Vidal
 Idea Vilariño
 Ida Vitale

See also
 List of Uruguayan women writers
 List of Latin American writers
 List of Uruguayans
 Uruguayan literature
 List of contemporary writers from northern Uruguay

Uruguayan
 List
Writers